Michael Weston Janus (July 27, 1966 – February 22, 2022) was an American politician.

Background
Janus was born in Charleston, South Carolina, and was born into a military family. The Janus family returned to Biloxi, Mississippi. Janus graduated from Biloxi High School. He received his bachelors degree from the University of South Alabama and his masters degree in public administration from University of Mississippi.

Political career
Janus served in the Mississippi House of Representatives from 1996 to 2009 and was a Republican. He served as city manager of D'lberville, Mississippi, from 2009 to 2013. He was convicted in federal court of program fraud. Janus died from cancer on February 22, 2022, at the age of 55.

References

1966 births
2022 deaths
Deaths from cancer in Mississippi
Republican Party members of the Mississippi House of Representatives
Mississippi politicians convicted of crimes
People from D'Iberville, Mississippi
Politicians from Biloxi, Mississippi
Politicians from Charleston, South Carolina
University of Mississippi alumni
University of South Alabama alumni
American politicians convicted of fraud